Corda is a settlement in the island of Santo Antão, Cape Verde. It is part of the municipality Ribeira Grande. It is situated in the mountainous interior of the island at about 1,000 meters elevation, 13 km north of the island capital Porto Novo. Corda consists of several villages, including Chã de Corda and Esponjeiro. The national road from Porto Novo to Ribeira Grande (EN1-SA01) passes through Corda. The crater of Cova lies 4 km to the southeast. Corda lies in the Cova-Paul-Ribeira da Torre Natural Park.

Two species of cuckoo bees, Thyreus batelkai and Chiasmognathus batelkai, have been found near Esponjeiro. Also a subspecies of butterflies, Leptotes pirithous capvertis has been found near Esponjeiro.

Climate data
Esponjeiro (south of Corda) has a steppe climate. The annual rainfall is 351 millimeters.

References

External links

Villages and settlements in Santo Antão, Cape Verde
Ribeira Grande Municipality